My True Love Gave to Me: Twelve Holiday Stories is a 2014 anthology edited by Stephanie Perkins with twelve holiday stories contributed by Perkins, Holly Black, Ally Carter, Matt de la Peña, Gayle Forman, Jenny Han, David Levithan, Kelly Link, Myra McEntire, Rainbow Rowell, Laini Taylor, and Kiersten White. The book was published on October 14, 2014 through St. Martin's Press.

Synopsis
This anthology features twelve stories set during the winter months. Each story is told separately and is about a different pair of characters falling in love in different holiday settings.

Stories
 “Midnights” by Rainbow Rowell
 “The Lady and the Fox” by Kelly Link
 “Angels in the Snow” by Matt de la Peña
 “Polaris Is Where You’ll Find Me” by Jenny Han
 "It’s a Yuletide Miracle, Charlie Brown” by Stephanie Perkins.
 "Your Temporary Santa” by David Levithan.
 "Krampuslauf" by Holly Black.
 "What the Hell Have You Done, Sophie Roth?” by Gayle Forman.
 “Beer Buckets and Baby Jesus” by Myra McEntire
 “Welcome to Christmas, CA” by Kiersten White.
 “Star of Bethlehem” by Ally Carter.
 "The Girl Who Woke the Dreamer" by Laini Taylor.

Reception
Reception for the book was generally positive, with Publishers Weekly stating "There's no shortage of cozy setups for holiday romance in this captivating collection of short stories", describing the book as "a rare seasonal treat". Ellen Hopkins of The New York Times Book Review praised the novel, describing it as "a marvelous collection, certain to earn a treasured spot on many Y.A. shelves" commending the diversity of the characters and intelligent storytelling.

References

2014 anthologies
Young adult anthologies
Christmas books
St. Martin's Press books